The 2013 4 Nations Cup was a women's ice hockey tournament held in Lake Placid, New York, United States. It was the 18th edition of the 4 Nations Cup.

Results

Preliminary round

All times are local (UTC−5).

Bronze medal game

Gold medal game

Statistics

Final standings

References

2013-14
2013–14 in Finnish ice hockey
2013–14 in Swedish ice hockey
2013–14 in Canadian women's ice hockey
2013–14 in American women's ice hockey
2013-14
2013–14 in women's ice hockey